Lebon or LeBon may refer to:

Surname 
 Bart LeBon (born 1952/1953), American politician
 Christophe Lebon (born 1982), French swimmer
Karine Lebon (born 1985), French politician
Philippe LeBon (1767–1804), French engineer

Other uses 
 Lebon Patisserie & Café, a defunct historic pastry shop and café in Istanbul, Turkey 
 Lebon, Port-Salut, Haiti, a village in the Sud Department of Haiti
 Lebon Régis, municipality of Brazil
 10838 Lebon, an asteroid
 Stade Lebon, a multi-use stadium in Angoulême, France

See also 
 Le Bon (disambiguation)
 Bon